Albert Montañés defend his 2009 title, after winning against Frederico Gil in the final. The Spaniard became the second player to win back-to-back titles at this tournament, following Thomas Muster in 1995 and 1996.

Seeds
The top four seeds receive a bye into the second round.

Draw

Finals

Top half

Bottom half

References
Main Draw
Qualifying Draw

Estoril Open - Singles
Portugal Open
Estoril Open - Mens Singles, 2010